The Porsche Macan (Type 95B) is a high-performance compact luxury crossover SUV produced by the German car manufacturer Porsche from 2014. It is built in Leipzig, Germany. The Macan range includes many variants, including the Macan, Macan T, Macan S, and the Macan GTS. The Macan shares a platform with the Audi Q5. It is the second least expensive car sold by Porsche, being just slightly more expensive than the Porsche 718 Cayman.

History 
Initially announced in November 2010 as a development project, and formally announced by Porsche in March 2011, the Macan model name was decided in 2012 and is derived from the Indonesian word for tiger.

The Macan was originally known by its code name , a portmanteau of Cayenne Junior or comes from a name of a member of ethnic group descended from Acadia living in the U.S. state of Louisiana (not to be confused with Porsche-Diesel Junior tractor).

Concept, design and production 
The Porsche Macan shares its platform and wheelbase with the first generation Audi Q5 (2008–2017). The suspension configuration is based on, and heavily modified from the Audi, but the engine, transfer case, suspension tuning, interior and exterior body are unique to the Macan. It is also  longer and  wider than a Q5.

The Macan is produced alongside the Panamera with which it shares a strong resemblance, in Leipzig, Germany in a newly extended factory. The Macan compact crossover SUV offers a more compact body than the Cayenne midsize crossover SUV. The Macan is also intended to be sportier than the Cayenne; for instance the Macan has a standard 7-speed dual-clutch PDK gearbox, which is more responsive, while the Cayenne has an 8-speed Tiptronic transmission for smoother shifts.

As of June 2017 1,071 units of the Macan were sold and 1,871 delivered that month, and 7,060 sold for that year to date, Porsche Cars North America Inc. announced.

In July 2018 Porsche announced that more than 350,000 units of the Macan have been delivered world-wide since 2014, with over 100,000 deliveries in the Chinese market.

First generation (2014–) 

The production version of the Macan was unveiled at the 2013 Los Angeles Auto Show and 2013 Tokyo Motor Show. European models went on sales in spring 2014 and the initial line-up of models included the Macan S and Macan Turbo.

US models arrived at U.S. dealerships in late spring 2014 as 2015 model year vehicle. Early models included Macan S, Macan Turbo.

Drivetrain and performance 
The Macan GTS was announced in October 2015 to fit into the gap between the Macan S and Macan Turbo.

All Macans feature a seven-speed PDK dual-clutch transmission and all-wheel drive, with several options available including air suspension and Porsche Active Suspension Management (PASM).

Porsche subsequently released a base Macan for select Asian markets and the United Kingdom. Using a reworked version of the Volkswagen Group's 2.0-litre inline-four EA888 Gen 3 engine used in multiple applications such as the Audi Q5, the Macan was the first Porsche to be powered by a four-cylinder since the Porsche 968, just preceding the four-cylinder Porsche 718 (Boxster and Cayman). This engine became offered globally for the Macan's 2017 model year following an announcement in March 2016. A , 2.0-litre four-cylinder diesel was due to join the range at a later date. But this engine variant was never actually offered in any market world-wide.

The Macan S and Macan Turbo have  times of 5.2 seconds and 4.6 seconds respectively. Both times are improved by 0.2 sec when employing Launch Control (feature of the optional "Sport Chrono" package).

Equipment 
Rear Seat Entertainment system became available in 2015.

Safety

Updates

2016 update, Macan GTS 
Changes to the Macan for 2016 include Porsche Communication Management system, optional full-LED headlights, redesigned steering controller, extended exterior and interior packages for Macan Turbo.

The Macan GTS was unveiled at the 2015 Tokyo Motor Show. The vehicles went on sale at Porsche dealers in early 2016, while orders began in Germany in 2015.

Four-cylinder model (2016–) 
Unveiled at the 2016 New York International Auto Show, the base Macan joined the range with an inline-four turbocharged 2.0-litre engine, matte black window surrounds, brake calipers in black, unique dual exhaust pipes in stainless steel, front fascia and lava black side blades from the Macan S, seat centres in Alcantara, the newest generation of Porsche Communication Management (PCM), Piano Black interior package and a lane departure warning system.

The four-cylinder model went on sale in the United States and globally as a 2017 model year vehicle, with deliveries beginning in July 2016.

2019 update 
The 2019 model year Macan was first unveiled in July 2018 in Shanghai as petrol four-cylinder base model and received its European debut at the 2018 Paris Motor Show. It went into production in August 2018. Changes to the previous model include an overhauled chassis, a gasoline particulate filter fitted as standard, a new front and rear fascia with LED head- and tail-lights as standard, new exterior colours and wheel designs, and a redesigned interior with Porsche Communication Management with 10.9-inch touchscreen display and Connect Plus with Porsche Offroad Precision App as standard. Optionally available systems include active suspension management, air suspension, torque vectoring, Sport Chrono package including Launch Control as well as park and traffic assistance systems.

Specifications 

* Available data for European model

Facelift (2021–) 

* Available data for European model

Second generation (EV) 
Porsche is currently developing the next generation of the Macan, which will be fully electric.  It is planned to use two electric motors with all-wheel drive and the same two-speed automatic transmission from the Taycan. The new Macan is expected to begin production in 2023.  Porsche intends to sell the original Macan, which it updated in 2021, alongside the all-electric Macan at its debut.

Awards and recognition 
 South African Car of the Year 2015
 Carsales Best Luxury SUV 2015
 Car and Driver Magazine 10Best for 2021

References

External links 
 
 Porsche Macan manual

Macan
Luxury crossover sport utility vehicles
Compact sport utility vehicles
All-wheel-drive vehicles
Euro NCAP small off-road
Cars introduced in 2014